Quoya cuneata is a flowering plant in the mint family Lamiaceae and is endemic to the south-west of Western Australia. It is a spreading shrub with its branches and leaves covered with a layer of woolly, pale white or brownish hairs. The flowers are blue at first but become white with purple spots inside the petal tube.

Description
Both surfaces of the leaf are blistered and covered with woolly hairs.

The flowers are surrounded by bracts and bracteoles which are hairy on the outer surface and glabrous on the inside. The sepals are densely woolly on the outside and mostly glabrous on the inside. The petal tube is blue at first but turns white with purple spots inside. The outside of the tube has short hairs and is mostly glabrous inside except for the large lower lip and a dense ring of hairs around the ovary. The four stamens extend a short distance beyond the end of the tube. Flowering occurs from August to November or December and is followed by the fruit which is oval-shaped to almost spherical,  in diameter with the sepals remaining attached.

Taxonomy and naming
This species was first formally described in 1828 by Charles Gaudichaud-Beaupré from a specimen collected in Shark Bay during the Bougainville expedition in the ships l'Uranie and la Physicienne from  1817 to 1820. The specific epithet (cuneata) is a Latin word meaning "wedge-shaped".

Distribution and habitat
Quoya cuneata grows in red sand between the Murchison River and Shark Bay in the Carnarvon, Geraldton Sandplains, Murchison and Yalgoo biogeographic regions.

Conservation
Quoya cuneata is classified as "not threatened" by the Western Australian Government Department of Parks and Wildlife.

References

cuneata
Plants described in 1828
Taxa named by Charles Gaudichaud-Beaupré